Bugskull is an American musical group originally from Portland, Oregon, United States, that performed and recorded during the 1990s and early 2000s.  According to a local newspaper, the Portland Mercury Review, discussing a one-off comeback concert they performed on September 12, 2009, they "delved deep into the world of ambience and electronics, exploring the outer brainscapes of music, littered with found sound, squeaks, whistles, drones, and hallucinations."

Members
Current
 Sean Byrne –  lead vocals, guitar (1992–present)
Former
 Brendan Bell – bass guitar, keyboards, saxophone, clarinet (1993–1997)
 James Yu – drums, violin (1993–1997)

Discography

Studio albums
Phantasies and Senseitions (Road Cone, 1994)
Crock (Pop Secret, 1995)
Snakland (Scratch, 1995)
Distracted Snowflake Volume One (Pop Secret, 1997)
Distracted Snowflake Volume Two (Scratch, 1999)
Bugskull & The Big White Cloud (Scratch, 2000)
Communication (Digitalis, 2009)
Hidden Mountain (Almost Halloween Time, 2012)
Collapsed View (Digitalis, 2014)

Compilation albums
Time Is Not Our Fried (Eldest Son, 2009)

Cassette albums
Subversives = Musgrove Complex (1992)
Subversives in the Midst (Shrimper, 1992)
Gargamelodies (Eldest Son, 1992)
Magic Tremelo (Eldest Son, 1993)

EPs
Bügsküll (Quixotic, 1993)

Singles
"Fences" (Road Cone, 1992)
"What I Had in Mind" (Dalmatian, 1993)
"Bügsküll" / "Sone" (Ross, 1994)
"Bügsküll" / "Quasi" (Red Rover, 1994)

References

External links
 Band website
 
 

Musical groups from Portland, Oregon
1990s establishments in Oregon
American experimental rock groups
Indie pop groups from Oregon
Indie rock musical groups from Oregon
Lo-fi music groups
Musical groups established in the 1990s
Musical groups established in 1992